CTNNA2, also known as αN-catenin and Catenin alpha-2, is a protein that in humans is encoded by the CTNNA2 gene

References